Hannah Craig (born 10 February 1983 in Ballymoney, Northern Ireland) is an Irish slalom canoer. At the 2012 Summer Olympics she competed in the K-1 event, finishing 10th in the final.

Telephone call
Famously, when a penalty was applied to Craig during the 2012 Summer Olympics, Carl Dunne, head of the Irish canoeing team, telephoned RTÉ's analyst to discuss the possibility of appealing the decision. The analyst took the telephone call live on television as a bemused Michael Lyster watched on.

References

Sports-Reference.com profile

1983 births
Living people
People from Ballymoney
Sportswomen from Northern Ireland
Canoeists at the 2012 Summer Olympics
Irish female canoeists
Olympic canoeists of Ireland
Canoeists from Northern Ireland